The 1946 Morgan State Bears football team was an American football team that represented Morgan State College in the Colored Intercollegiate Athletic Association (CIAA) during the 1946 college football season. In their 18th season under head coach Edward P. Hurt, the Bears compiled an 8–0 record, won the CIAA championship, shut out four of eight opponents, and outscored all opponents by a total of 151 to 31. 

The Dickinson System rated Tennessee A&I as the No. 1 black college football team for 1946 with a score of 27.27, ahead of No. 2 Morgan State with a score of 26.0, No. 3 Tuskegee with a score of 25.0, and No. 4 Wilberforce with a score of 23.57. Despite the Dickinson rankings, the Bears were recognized as the 1946 black college national co-champion along with Tennessee A&I. 

The 1946 season was the 10th of 12 undefeated season for Morgan State under head coach Edgar Hurt. Key players on the 1946 team included backs Terry Day and George Watkins, quarterbacks Cyril Byron and Oscar Givens, fullback George Rooks, halfback Jonathan Campbell, center Earl F. Couch II, tackles Bertram Coppock and Lorenzo Thomas, end Joseph Eggleston, placekicker Willard Jones, and punter Tippy Day.

Schedule

References

Morgan State
Morgan State Bears football seasons
Black college football national champions
College football undefeated seasons
Morgan State Bears football